Holbrookia propinqua (keeled earless lizard) is a species of phrynosomatid lizard.

Description

The dorsal scales are small, pointed, and keeled, as the common name implies. The lateral scales are similar but smaller. The ventral scales, which are flat and smooth, are 3-4 times larger than the dorsal scales. Adults may attain  snout to vent length (SVL),  total length.

Geographic range and habitat
Holbrookia propinqua occurs in the Tamaulipan mezquital ecoregion where it is known from various vegetation zones in south Texas, including mixed oak forest, mesquite brush-lands, cleared fields, coastal prairie, and grasslands, although always where bands of Tertiary sand outcrops or sandy stream-side deposits are found. It is perhaps most common in the loose and shifting sands of beaches, barrier islands, and the Coastal Sand Plain of Southern Texas. It also ranges into northeast Mexico but it is highly restricted to the narrow zone of sand dunes of the coastal beaches, peninsulas, and barrier islands of Tamaulipas and southward to the vicinity of Veracruz, Veracruz.

Subspecies 
There are three recognized subspecies of Holbrookia propinqua:

northern keeled earless lizard, Holbrookia propinqua propinqua Baird & Girard, 1852
southern keeled earless lizard, Holbrookia propinqua piperata H.M. Smith & Burger, 1950
Stone's keeled earless lizard, Holbrookia propinqua stonei Harper, 1932

References 

Holbrookia
Reptiles of Mexico
Reptiles of the United States
Fauna of the Southwestern United States
Fauna of the Rio Grande valleys
Reptiles described in 1852